The Insensitive Princess is a 1983 French animated television series written and directed by Michel Ocelot. The animation is a combination of cel and cutout animation (with the opening credits in silhouette animation) while the elaborate architectural style of the production design has been said to be reminiscent, through visual association, of Charles Perrault and Jean de La Fontaine's fairy tales; like Ocelot's Les Trois Inventeurs before it and several episodes of the later Ciné si it takes place in a literary fairy-tale fantasy setting, specifically a palatial theater, which mixes the ornate styles of decoration and dress of the upper classes of both the time of the Ancien Régime and the Belle Époque and includes such fanciful technology as a baroque submarine, elements of outright fantasy such as dragons and such anachronisms as a reference to motorcycles.

It won first prize in its category at the 3rd Bourg-en-Bresse Animation Festival for Youth and the audience prize at the 6th Odense Film Festival.

Plot

The king's daughter, nicknamed the insensitive princess, is in need of a suitor. It has been decided that the prince who will make her show emotion will win her hand in marriage. Multiple princes attempt the feat of entertaining the princess, combining elaborate acts of artistry, prowess and more. However, at the end of each episode, the princess remains unfazed, appearing confused, to the dismay of the princes. At last, when all seems lost, a schoolboy prince presents himself in the palace theater with a large heart, surprising the princess. The schoolboy had correctly predicted that the princess was short-sighted. He suits her with a pair of glasses, allowing her to witness the acts and theatricals she had previously been unable to distinguish, and is now entertained. The schoolboy prince wins the princess over and everyone celebrates.

Episodes
  (The Tamer Prince)
  (The Gardener Prince)
  (The Transforming Prince)
  (The Meteorologist Prince)
  (The Dowser Prince)
  (The Flying Prince)
  (The Submarine Prince)
  (The Painter Prince)
  (The Decorator Prince)
  (The Magician Prince)
  (The Pretending Prince)
  (The Pyrotechnist Prince)
  (The Schoolboy Prince)

International broadcasts

References

External links
 Extract from the first episode
 Translation of the theme song

French children's animated fantasy television series
1983 French television series debuts
Steampunk television series
Films directed by Michel Ocelot
1980s French animated television series
Belle Époque